Vecelin, also Vecellin and Vencellin, was a prominent military commander of Stephen I of Hungary at the end of the 10th and the beginning of the 11th century. He was of Bavarian origin and came from a city named as either Wasserburg or Weissenburg.

See also
Hont and Pázmány

References

Sources

10th-century Hungarian people
Hungarian nobility
Medieval German knights
German expatriates in Hungary
10th-century German people